Jean Poton de Xaintrailles (1390? – 7 October 1461), a minor noble of Gascon origin, was one of the chief lieutenants of Joan of Arc. He served as master of the royal stables, as royal bailiff in Berry and as seneschal of Limousin. In 1454 he was appointed a Marshal of France. Jean Poton was a leading figure on the French side in the Hundred Years War. 

He fought at the battle of Verneuil in 1424. His participation, along with Joan of Arc, in the battle at Orléans in 1429 led to the end of the Siege of Orléans.  He was badly wounded during this battle. He was captured by the Earl of Warwick in a skirmish at Savignies near Beauvais in 1431. In 1433 he was exchanged for John Talbot. Jean Poton fought numerous battles alongside Joan of Arc during the Loire Campaign. He remained a lifelong support for Joan of Arc. With La Hire, he even tried, albeit in vain, to rescue Joan after she was captured. Believing Joan was being held captive in Compiègne, Jean Poton captured it, only to learn that the prisoner had already been moved to Rouen.

He served with Joan of Arc at the Siege of Orléans, and the battles of Jargeau, Meung-sur-Loire, Beaugency and Patay. He raised the siege of Compiègne.

In the latter phase of the Hundred Years War he was active in the reconquest of Normandy and the conquest of Guyenne, often with Étienne de Vignolles, better known as La Hire, including the action at Gerbevoy. When the standing army was created in 1445, Xaintrailles was appointed to command one of the twelve companies of the new army.

He died in Bordeaux without heirs and left his estate to the church.

Popular culture
Xaintrailles is a minor figure in the "Catherine" novels of Juliette Benzoni.

See also
Military history of France

References

Marshals of France
People of the Hundred Years' War
Noblemen of France
1390 births
1461 deaths
French prisoners of war in the Hundred Years' War
15th-century military history of France